Rose Atoll, sometimes called Rose Island or Motu O Manu ("Bird Island") by people of the nearby Manu'a Islands, is an oceanic atoll within the U.S. territory of American Samoa. An uninhabited wildlife refuge, it is the southernmost point belonging to the United States. The land area is just  at high tide. Just west of the northernmost point is a channel into the lagoon, about 40 m wide. There are two islets on the northeastern rim of the reef, larger Rose Island in the east (3.5 m high) and the non-vegetated Sand Island in the north (1.5 m high). The Rose Atoll Marine National Monument that lies on the two outstanding islands of the Atoll is managed cooperatively between the U.S. Fish and Wildlife Service and the government of American Samoa.

History

The earliest Western sighting was June 13, 1722, during the voyage of Jacob Roggeveen, who called it Vuil Eiland "useless island." The name Rose Island comes from its sighting by Louis de Freycinet in 1819. He named it after his wife Rose. While the second woman to circumnavigate the globe, Rose de Freycinet was the first to tell her tale. In his official report Louis de Freycinet records that  'I named Rose Island, from the name of someone who is extremely dear to me'. Soon afterwards, in 1824, it was seen by the expedition under Otto von Kotzebue, who named it Kordinkov after his First Lieutenant.

Fauna
Rose Atoll contains the largest populations of giant clams, nesting seabirds and rare reef fish in all of American Samoa.  The fish population is different from the rest of the region due to a high concentration of carnivorous fish and low concentration of herbivorous fish.  Almost 270 different species of fish have been recorded in the last 15 years.  Tuna, mahi-mahi, billfish, barracuda and sharks reside outside the lagoon.  In deeper waters, tunicates and stalked crinoids have been spotted by scuba expeditions.  Sea mammals such as the endangered humpback whale and the dolphin genus Stenella also use the waters.

The atoll is a critical nesting habitat for the threatened green turtle and the endangered hawksbill turtle.  The turtles migrate between American Samoa and other Pacific island nations.  Their nesting season is between the months of August and February.

Approximately 97% of American Samoa's seabird population resides on Rose Atoll.  Each of the 12 bird species is federally protected.  Red-footed boobies and greater and lesser frigate birds nest in the buka trees.  Black noddies and white terns nest in the middle and lower branches.  The root system is used by reef herons and red-tailed tropic birds.  Other birds can be found in the Pisonia forest, the only one left in Samoa. The atoll has been recognised as an Important Bird Area (IBA) by BirdLife International because it supports a breeding population of some 400,000 sooty terns, as estimated in 1974.

See also

 Rose Island Concrete Monument
 Desert island
 List of islands

References

External links
American Samoa, its districts and unorganized islands, United States Census Bureau
A Summary of Information on Rose Atoll (Atoll Research Bulletin #29)

Uninhabited islands of American Samoa
Atolls of American Samoa
Important Bird Areas of American Samoa
Important Bird Areas of the Samoan Islands